Platensina fulvifacies is a species of tephritid or fruit flies in the genus Platensina of the family Tephritidae.

Distribution
India.

References

Tephritinae
Insects described in 1941
Diptera of Asia